In Akkadian mythology, Antu or Antum (Akkadian:𒀭𒌈) is a Babylonian goddess. She was the first consort of Anu, and the pair were the parents of the Anunnaki and the Utukki.

Antu was a later development of Ki, an earlier Sumerian earth goddess. She was also conflated with Kishar.

According to the Akkadian pantheon, clouds were Antum's breasts and rain was her breast milk.

References

Sources
 
 Jordan, M. (2002). Encyclopedia of Gods, Kyle Cathie Limited.
 

Mesopotamian goddesses
Sky and weather goddesses
Earth goddesses
Inanna